This list of trilobites is a comprehensive listing of all genera that have ever been included in the Arthropod class Trilobita, excluding purely vernacular terms. The list includes all commonly accepted genera, but also genera that are now considered invalid, doubtful, or were not formally published, as well as junior synonyms of more established names, and genera that are no longer considered trilobites.

A

Aa
Aayemenaytcheia

Ab
Abadiella (=Parabadiella; =Danagouia)
Abakania
Abakanopleura
Abakolia (=Costadiscus)
Abdulinaspis
Abharella

Ac
Acadolenus
Acadoparadoxides (=Entomolithus; =Entomostracites; =Eoparadoxides)
Acanthalomina
Acanthocephalus (=Alomataspis)
Acanthometopus
Acanthomicmacca (=Chengkouia; =Jaskovitchella; =Myopsomicmacca)
Acanthoparypha
Acanthophillipsia
Acanthopleurella
Acanthopyge (=Euarges)
Acastava
Acaste
Acastella
Acastellina
Acastocephala
Acastoides
Acastopyge
Acernaspis (=Eskaspis; =Otadenus; =Murphycops)
Acerocare
Acerocarina (=Cyclognathus)
Aceroproetus
Achatella
Acheilops
Acheilus
Achlysopsis
Aciculolenus
Acidaspidella
Acidaspides
Acidaspidina
Acidaspis
Acidiphorus (=Goniotelina; =Goniotelus; =Goniurus)
Acidiscus
Acimetopus
Acmarhachis (=Cyclagnostus; =Oxyagnostus; =Wanagnostus)
Acontheus (=Aneucanthus; =Aneuacanthus)
Acrocephalaspina
Acrocephalaspis
Acrocephalella
Acrocephalina
Acrocephalinella
Acrocephalites (=Acantholenus)
Acrocephalops
Acrodirotes
Acropyge
Actinopeltis
Acuticryphops
Acutimetopus

Ad
Adastocephalum
Adelogonus

Ae
Aedotes
Aegrotocatellus
Aegunaspis
Aethedionide
Aethia
Aethochuangia

Af
Afghancephalites
Afghanocare
Afrops

Ag
Agasella
Agaso
Agelagma (?=Paradistazeris)
Agerina (=Otarionellina; =Otarionella)
Agnostardis
Agnostogonus
Agnostotes
Agnostus (=Battus; =Acutatagnostus)
Agraulaeva
Agraulos (=Arion; =Arionius; =Arionides; =Arionellus; =Agrauloides)AguarayaAguilarellaAgyrenellaAiAiaiaspisAidarellaAikhaliellaAinasuellaAistagnostusAjAjacicrepidaAjrikinaAkAkanthargesAkbashichiaAksayaspisAksuaspisAktugaiellaAlAlacephalusAlanisiaAlaskadiscusAlaskaletheAlataupleuraAlataurusAlbansiaAlbertellaAlbertellinaAlbertelloides (=Chuchiaspis)AlberticorypheAlborsellaAlcesteAlcymeneAldanaspisAldanianus (="Comptocephalus") AldonaiaAlekcinellaAligeritesAllobodochusAlloillaenusAlloleiostegiumAllolichasAlokistocare (=Pseudoalokistocare)AlokistocarellaAlokistocaropsisAltaepeltisAltaesajaniaAltaiaspisAltajaspisAltikoliaAltiocculusAltiplanelaspisAltitudellaAluevaAlwynulusAmAmblycraniumAmbonoliumAmecephalinaAmecephalitesAmecephaloidesAmecephalus (=Strotocephalus)AmechilusAmeropiltoniaAmeuraAmgaspidellaAmgaspisAmginiaAmginoerbiaAmginouyiaAmiaspisAmicusAmmagnostus (=Lispagnostus; =Agnostoglossa; =Tentagnostus)AmorphellaAmphilichas (=Paralichas; =Platymetopus; =Acrolichas; =Kerakephalichas; =Tetralichas)Amphitryon (=Caphyra Barrande, 1846; =Brachypleura)AmphoriopsAmphoton (=Eurodeois; =Amphotonella; =Paramphoton; =Sunia)AmpullatocephalinaAmpulliglabellaAmpyx (=Brachyampyx)AmpyxellaAmpyxinaAmpyxinellaAmpyxoidesAmquiaAmzasskiella (=Triplacephalus)

AnAnabaracepsAnabaraspisAnacaenaspis (=Bruxaspis)AnacheiruraspisAnacheirurusAnacopodiaAnaloxAnambonAnanaspisAnapliomeraAnasobellaAnataphrusAnaximanderAnchiopellaAnchiopsisAncyginaspisAncyropygeAndalusianaAndegavia (=Sagittapeltis)Anderssonella (=Anderssonia)AndinacasteAndrarina (=Liostracus)AndreaspisAnebolithusAnecocephalusAnemocephalopsAnemocephalusAngelina (=Keidelaspis)AnglagnostusAngliboleAngsiduoaAngulophacopsAngustaevaAngustiboleAngustolenellusAnhuiaspisAnisonotellaAnisopygeAnkouraAnnamitella (=Bathyuriscops; =Endoaspis; =Wutingia; =Proetiella; =Monella)AnnamitiaAnomocareAnomocarella (=Psilaspis; =Entorachis)AnomocarelliusAnomocarinaAnomocarioidesAnomocariopsisAnopocodiaAnopolenusAnoriaAntagmellaAntagmopleura (=Poljakovia)AntagmusAntatlasiaAnthracopeltisAnujaspisAnuloidesAoAocaspisAotiaspisApApachia (=Apachilites)ApatokephalinaApatokephaloidesApatokephalops (=Aristokainella; =Wanliangtingia)ApatokephalusApatolichasAphelaspidellaAphelaspis (=Proaulacopleura; =Clevelandella; =Labiostria)ApheloidesAphelotoxon (=Ponumia)ApianurusApiflabellumAplexuraApocalymeneApollonaspisApomodociaAponileusApoplaniasAppendicystaAprathiaArAraeocephalusAragotusAraiocarisAraiopleuraArapahoia (=Hesperaspis)AratorArcadiaspisArchaeagnostusArchaeaspisArchaeocorypheArchaeopleuraArchaeulomaArchegonus (=Cylindraspis)ArchikainellaArcifimbriaArcticalymeneArcticeraurinellaArctinurus (=Oncholichas; =Platynotus; =Pterolichas)ArctipeltisArcuolenellusArcuolimbusArduennellaArduennopsAreiaAreiaspisArellanellaArgasalinaArgentopygeArglinaArgunaspisArmagnostusArmorigreenopsArraphusArrhenaspisArthricocephalus (=Arthricocephalites; =Protoryctocara; =Oryctocarella)ArtokephalusAsAsaphellinaAsaphellus (=Asaphelloides; =Asaphoon; =Hemigyraspis; =Megalaspidella; =Plesiomegalaspis)AsaphiscusAsaphopsisAsaphopsoides (=Dainellicauda; =Xiangxiia)Asaphus (=Schizophorus)AscetopeltisAscionepeaAsiagenaAsiatellaAsilluchusAsiocephalusAsperocareAspidaeglinaAspidagnostus (=Biragnostus)AspidochuangiaAsteropygeAstenaspisAsthenopsisAstroproetus (=Clypoproetus; =Enodiproetus; =Sibiroproetus)AsturiaspisAstycorypheAtAtdabanellaAthabaskiaAthabaskiellaAtilayus (="Deltocephalus") AtopasaphusAtopiaspisAtopinaAtopophacopsAtops (=Ivshiniellus)AtractocybeloidesAtractopyge (=Cybelella)AtratebiaAtypicusAuAulacodigmaAulacopariaAulacoparinaAulacopleura (=Arethusa; =Arethusina; =Paraaulacopleura)AulacopleurinaAulacopleuroidesAuriculaAuritamaAustinvilliaAustralaspisAustraloacasteAustralokaskiaAustralomyttoniaAustralopsAustralopygeAustraloscutellumAustralosuturaAutoloxolichasAvAvalanchurusAvaloniaAvascutellum (=Ctenoscutellum; =Rutoscutellum)AvoninaAwAwariaAyAytounellaAzAzyptyx B 

Ba
 BabinopsBadainjaranaspisBadulesiaBagongshaniaBagradiaBaikadamaspisBaikonuraspisBailiaspisBailiella (=Liaotungia; =Liocephalus; =Tangshihella)BailielloidesBainella (=Paradalmanites; =Paranacaste)BajanaspisBajangoliaspisBalangcunaspisBalangiaBalcoracaniaBalderiaBalizomaBalnibarbiBaltagnostus (?=Trilagnostus)BaltiitesBaltobergstroemiaBaltoparadoxidesBancroftolithusBandalaspisBaniaspisBanilatitesBanqiaoitesBaoshanaspisBapingaspisBarklyellaBarrandeopeltisBarrandiaBasanellusBashaniaBasidechenellaBasilicus (=Basiliella; =Carinobasiliella; =Dolerobasilicus; =Basilicoides; =Mekynophrys; =Parabasilicus)BasocephalusBatenoidesBathycheilus (=Parabathycheilus)BathydiscusBathyholcusBathynotellusBathynotus (=Pagura)BathyocosBathyurellusBathyuriscellusBathyuriscidellaBathyuriscopsisBathyuriscus (=Orria; =Orriella; =Wenkchemnia)BathyurusBatocara (=Australurus)BavarillaBayfieldiaBeBedicellaBeggaspisBeigongiaBeikuangaspisBeishanellaBeldirellaBeleckellaBelenopsBelenopyge (=Lobopyge)BelgiboleBellacartwrightiaBellaspidellaBellaspisBellefontiaBellicepsBeloviaBenedettiaBenesovellaBenthamaspis (=Oculomagnus)BenxiellaBeothuckiaBerabichiaBergamia (=Bohemaspis; =Brandysops; =Cochliorrhoe)BergerolimbusBergeroniaspisBergeroniellusBergeronites (=Spinopanura)BerkeiaBerkutaspisBessazoonBestjubellaBettonolithusBevanopsisBiBiavertaBicellaBiceratopsBiciragnostusBidjinellaBienellaBienvillia (=Diatemnus; =Mendoparabolina)BifodinaBigotinaBigotinellaBigotinopsBigranulellaBijaspisBijelinaBilacunaspisBilimbataiaBillevittiaBillingsaspisBinellaBinervusBinodaspis (=Xilingxia)BirmanitellaBirmanites (=Opsimasaphus)BitumulinaBlBlackwelderia (=Parablackwelderia)BlackwelderioidesBlainiaBlainiopsisBlandiaspisBlandicephalusBlanodalmanitesBlayacinaBlodgettiaBlosyropsisBlountia (=Homodictya; =Protillaenus; =Stenocombus)BlountiellaBlountinaBlystagnostusBo
 Boeckaspis (=Boeckia; =Sphaerophthalmella)BoeckopsBoedaspisBoestrupiaBohemillaBohemiproetusBohemoharpes (=Declivoharpes; =Unguloharpes)BohemopygeBojocorypheBojoscutellum (=Holomeris)BolaspidaspisBolaspidella (=Deissella; =Howellaspis)BolaspidellusBolaspidinaBolaspisBolbocephalusBolbochasmopsBolbolenellusBolbopariaBolivicraniaBoliviproetusBollandiaBondarevitesBondonellaBonnariaBonnaspidellaBonnaspisBonneterrina (=Holstonia; =Piedmontia)BonniaBonniellaBonnimaBonnioidesBonniopsisBorealargesBorealaspis (=Alreboaspis)BorealiaBoreoscutellumBorkopleuraBornemannaspisBornholmaspisBorogothusBorovikoviaBorthaspidellaBoschchekuliaBotomella (=Sayanella)BotrioidesBouleia (=Dereimsia)BowmaniaBrBrabbiaBrachyaspidion (=Brachyaspis)BrachyaspisBrachyhipposiderusBrachymetopellaBrachymetopus (=Brachymetopina; =Iriania)Brackebuschia (=Bodenbenderia; =Hexianella)BradocryphaeusBradyfallotaspisBraintreellaBranisaspisBraunopsBreizhopsBreviboleBreviphillipsiaBreviredlichiaBreviscutellumBrevitermierella (=Paratermierella)Brianurus (=Briania)BridgeiaBriscoiaBristoliaBroeggerolithus (=Ulricholithus)BromellaBrongniartella (=Pamirotellus; =Portaginus)Bronteopsis (=Homoglossa)BrontocephalinaBrontocephalusBrunswickiaBrutaspisBrutonaspisBrutoniaBuBubupeltinaBuchiproetusBuenaspisBuenellusBufoceraurusBuitellaBulaiaspisBulbaspisBulbolenusBulkuraspisBumastellaBumastidesBumastoidesBumastusBurgesinaBurlingiaBurmeisterellaBurmeisteriaBurminresiaBurnetiella (=Burnetia)BurtonopsButtsiaButtsiellaButyriniaByBynumiaBynuminaBythicheilus C 

CaCaborcellaCaganaspisCainatops (=Cornucoryphe)CalipernurusCallaspisCallavia (=Cephalacanthus; =Callavalonia; =Cobboldus)CallidaspinaCallidaspisCalliopsCalmoniaCalocephalitesCalodiscus (=Goniodiscus; =Brevidiscus)CalvinellaCalvipeltaCalyboleCalycinoidiaCalycoscutellumCalymene (=Calymena; =Calymaena; =Calymmene; =Calymmena)CalymenellaCalymenesunCalymeniaCalymenidiusCalyptaulax (=Ligometopus; =Homalops)CamaraspisCamaraspoidesCambroinyoellaCambropallasCambrophatictorCambrunicorniaCamselliaCancapoliaCanningellaCanotaspisCanotiana (=Williamsina)CaputrotundumCarbonocorypheCarbonoproetusCarinamalaCarinocraniumCarinopygeCarlopsiaCarmonCarniphillipsiaCarolinites (=Dimastocephalus; =Keidelia; =Tafnaspis)CatadoxidesCataplotaspisCatasolenopleuraCathayanellaCatillicephala (=Cephalocoelia)CatillicephalitesCatinouyiaCatochiaCatuniellaCaulaspinaCaulaspisCavetiaCayastaiaCayupaniaCaznaiaCeCedarapisCedariaCedarinaCekoviaCelmus (=Crotalurus; =Ischyrophyma)CeltencrinurusCentauropygeCentonellaCentriproetusCentropleuraCerampyxCeratarges (=Arges)CeratevenkaspisCeratocaraCeratocephala (=Bounyongia; =Onchaspis)CeratocephalinaCeratolichasCeratonurusCeratopeltisCeratoproetusCeratopygeCeraurinella (=Bartoninus)CerauriniumCeraurinus (=Remipyga)CerauromerosCerauropeltisCeraurus (=Eoceraurus)CermataspisCermatopsCernuolimbusCeronocareChChacomurusChakasskiaChakasskiellaChalchaquianaChalfontiaChambersiellusChamplainiaChanciaChanciaopsisChangchowillaChangia (=Coreanocephalus; =Fengshania)Changqingia (=Austrosinia)Changshania (=Metachangshania; =Prochangshania)ChangshanocephalusChangyangiaChaoaspisCharabaiaCharaulaspisCharchaqia (=Aplotaspis)ChariocephalusChashaniaChasmopsChatiania (=Parachatiania)Chatkalagnostus (=Oculagnostus)ChattiaspisChauffouraspisChaunoproetoidesChaunoproetus (=Carnicia)Cheilocephalus (=Pseudolisania; =Zhalangtania)Cheiropyge (=Suturikephalion)Cheiruroides (=Inikanella)CheirurusChekiangaspisChelediscusChelidonocephalusChencuniaChengjiangaspisChengkouaspisChengkouellaChengkouiaChengshanaspisChiarumanipygeChiawangellaChichikaspisChiidesChilometopusChilonorriaChimaerastellaChinghisicusChiopsChiozoonChishanheellaChittidilla (=Diandongaspidella; =Diandongaspis)ChlupaculaChlustiniaCholopilusChomatopygeChondagraulosChondragraulinaChondranomocareChondrastaulinaChondrinouvinaChondrinouyinaChondropariaChorbusulinaChosenia (=Leiostegioides)Chotecops (=Cordapeltis)ChoubertellaChuangia (=Schantungia; =Parachuangia; =Pterochuangia)ChuangiellaChuanginaChuangioidesChuangiopsisChuangitesChuanqianoproetusChugaeviaChulanolenusChunghwaellaChurkiniaCiCiliaCiliocephalusCiliscutellumCinnellaCirculocraniaCirquellaClClarellaClariondiaClarkeaspisClavagnostus (=Tomorhachis; =Culipagnostus; =Stigmagnostus; =Acanthagnostus; =Leptagnostus; =Paraclavagnostus)ClavaspidellaClavatellusClaviboleClavigellusClelandia (=Harrisia; =Bynumiella)ClemenellaCliffiaCloacaspisCnCnemidopygeCoCobbolditesCoenaspisCoenaspoidesCoephalocoeliaspisCoignopsCollicepsCollisColobinionColossaspisColpocoryphe (=Thoralocoryphe)ColtraneiaColumbicephalusComanchiaCombewoodiaComluellaCompsocephalus (=Lepidocephaloides)ComptonaspisComuraConagraulosConaspisCondylopyge (=Paragnostus; =Fallagnostus)ConicephalusConimetopusConiproetusConnagnostusConococheagueaConocoryphe (=Conocephalites; =Conocephalus; =Couloumania)ConoidesConokephalina (=Lobocephalina; =Ruzickaia; =Lobocephalus)Conolichas (=Cypholichas)ConomicmaccaConophillipsiaConophrysConopolusConoredlichiaConstantinaConstrictellaContracheirurusCoosella (=Wilsonella)CoosiaCoosinaCoosinoidesCoplacopariaCorbiniaCorcoraniaCordaniaCoreolenusCornuproetusCornuscutellumCoronocephalus (=Coronocephalina; =Senticucullus)CoronuraCorrugatagnostus (=Segmentagnostus; =Granulatagnostus; =Cenagnostus)CorycephalusCorynexochellaCorynexochidesCorynexochinaCorynexochus (=Karlia)CostapygeCostoniaCotalagnostusCourtessoliumCrCraigheadiaCraspedargesCraspedopsCrassiboleCrassifimbraCrassiproetusCrepicephalina (=Mesocrepicephalus)CrepicephalusCrepichilellaCriotypusCristagnostusCrithias =Endogramma; =Enneacnemis; =Goniacanthus; =Micropyge; =Monadina; =Monadella; =Selenosema; =Staurogmus; =Tetracnemis)CroixanaCromus (=Encrinuraspis)CrossouraCrotalocephalidesCrotalocephalina (=Gibbocephalus; =Mezocrotalus)Crotalocephalus (=Cerauroides; =Pilletopeltis; =Boeckia)CrozonaspisCrucicephalusCrusoiaCrusoiinaCryphaeoidesCryphinaCryphops (=Gortania; =Microphthalmus)CryptoderaspisCryptolithoidesCryptolithusCtCtenocephalusCtenopygeCuCuchulainCulmenaspisCultropsCummingellaCuriaspisCurriellaCuruyellaCurvoryctocephalusCuyanaspisCyCyamella (=Cyamops; =Paracyamella)CybantyxCybele (genus) (=Cybelina)CybellelaCybeloidesCybelopsis Cybelurus (=Miracybele)CyclognathinaCyclolorenzellaCyclopyge (=Egle; =Aeglina)CyphambonCyphaspidesCyphaspis (=Novakaspis)CyphinioidesCyphoniscusCyphoproetusCyrtodechenellaCyrtometopellaCyrtometopusCyrtoproetusCyrtoproraCyrtosymboleCyrtosymboloidesCystispina D 

DaDactylocephalusDaguinaspis (=Eodaguinaspis; =Epidaguinaspis)DaihuaiaDalarnepeltisDalaspisDaldynaspisDaldyniaDalejeproetusDalmanites (=Dalmania; =Guaranites; =Hausmannia; =Heliocephalus; =Makaspis; =Ommokris)DalmanitinaDalmanitoidesDalmaniturusDamesella (=Haibowania; =Eodamesella)Damesops (=Meringaspis; =Paradamesops)DamiaoaspisDananzhuangaspisDananzhuangiaDanarcusDanjiangellaDanzhaiaspisDanzhaisaukiaDaopingiaDartonaspisDasometopusDatongitesDatsoniaDawsonia (=Aculeodiscus; =Metadiscus)DayinaspisDayongiaDaytoniaDazhuiaDeDeacybeleDeanaspisDeanokephalusDechenella (=Eudechenella)DechenelloidesDechenellurusDeckeraDeclivolithusDecordinaspisDecoroproetus (=Ogmocnemis; =Proetidella)DecoroscutellumDecusDegamellaDeinoproetusDeiphonDeiracephalus (=Asteraspis)DeiradonyxDekalymeneDelagnostusDelamarina (=Delamarella)DelariaDelgadella (=Alemtejoia; =Delgadodiscus; =Delgadoia; =Pagetiellus; =Pentagonalia)DelgadoaDelinghaspisDellea (=Eshelmania)DelleanaDelocareDeloitesDeloopsDelopsDeltacareDeltacephalaspisDeltadechenellaDeltinaDeltophthalmusDemeteropsDemuma (=Pruvostina)DenagnostusDenaspisDenckmannites (=Denckmannia)DenellaDenemarkiaDensocephalusDentaloscutellumDerikaspisDesmetiaDesmusDespujolsiaDestombesinaDestombesitesDiDiaboleDiacalymeneDiacanthaspisDiacorypheDiademaproetusDianopsDiaoyaspisDiaphanometopusDicanthopygeDiceratocephalinaDiceratocephalusDiceratopyge (=Paraceratopyge)DicerodiscusDichelepyge (=Bicornipyge)DicranogmusDicranopeltis (=Dicranopeltoides; =Nonix; =Raymondarges; =Trachylichas; =Tsunyilichas)DicranurusDictyaDictyellaDictyocephalitesDidrepanonDidwudinaDiemanosaukiaDienstinaDignacepsDignagnostusDigonusDigryposDikellaDikelocephalioidesDikelocephalitesDikelocephalopsisDikelocephalusDikelokephalinaDikelusDilatalimbusDilataspisDimeropyge (=Haploconus)DimeropygiellaDindymene (=Cornovica)DinesusDingxiangaspisDionide (=Dione; =Dionidepyga; =Trigrypos)DionideinaDionidellaDipentaspisDipharangusDipharusDiplagnostus (=Enetagnostus; =Tasagnostus)DiplapatokephalusDipleuraDipleuropygeDiplorrhina (=Mesospheniscus; =Quadragnostus; =Pseudoperonopsis)DiplozygaDipyrgotesDiscagnostusDislobosaspisDistagnostusDistazerisDistyraxDitomopyge (=Cyphinium; =Permoproetus; =Neophillipsia)Dividuagnostus (=Pezizopsis)DixiphopygeDnDnestrovitesDoDokimocephalusDolerolenusDolerolichiaDolgaiellaDolgeulomaDolichagnostusDolichoharpesDolicholeptusDolichometopsisDolichometopusDonggouiaDoremataspisDoryagnostus (=Ceratagnostus; =Rhodotypiscus)DorypygaspisDorypygeDorypyginaDorypygoidesDoublatiaDouposiella (=Tongshania)

DrDrabiaDrepanopygeDrepanuroides (=Xishuiella)DresbachiaDrevermanniaDreyfussina (=Prephacopidella)DrotopsDrozdoviellaDrumaspisDuDuamsannellaDubhglasina (=Australoharpes; =Sinoharpes)DubovikitesDuctinaDudleyaspisDuduDuftoniaDuibianaspisDulanaspisDunderbergiaDunderburgellaDunopygeDuodingiaDuploraDuriniaDushaniaDuyunaspisDuyuniaDyDysplanusDytremacephalus E 

EbEbenezeriaEcEccoptochileEccoptochiloidesEchidnopsEchinolichasEchinophacopsEchinopygeEctenaspisEctenonotusEctillaenus (=Wossekia)

EdEdelsteinaspisEdgecombeaspisEdithiellaEdmundsoniaEfEffnaspisEffopsEgyngolia (=Mongolodiscus)EhmaniaEhmaniella (=Anomalocephalus; =Clappaspis)

EiEifliargesEilidhEiluraEirelithusEjEjinaspisEjinoproetusEkEkeraspisEkwanoscutellumEkwipagetiaElElandaspisElankaspisElaphraellaElasmaspisElatilimbusElburgiaEldoradiaEldredgeiaEldredgeopsElegenodechenellaElegestinaEleutherocentrusElganellusElicicolaElimaproetusElkiaEllesidesEllipsocephaloidesEllipsocephalus (=Germaropyge)EllipsostrenuaEllipsotaphrusEllipsuellaElliptocephala (=Georgiellus)ElliptophillipsiaEllsaspisElongatanileusElrathiaElrathiella (=Coelaspis; =Glossocoryphus)ElrathinaElsarellaElvinaspisElvinia (=Moosia)ElviniellaElvinioidesElviraspisElyaspisElyx (=Eryx)

EmEmanuelaspisEmanuelinaEmmrichopsEmsurellaEmsurinaEmuellaEnEnammocephalusEnantiaspisEncrinurellaEncrinuroidesEncrinuraspisEncrinurus (=Saoria)EndopsEndymionia (=Endymion)Engelomorrisia (=Capricornia)Enixus (=Schistocephalus)EnsecorypheEnshiaEntomaspis (=Hypothetica)EntsynaEntsynaEoEoacidaspisEoagnostusEoampyxEoanomocarellaEoapatokephalusEoasaphiscellus (=Eoasaphiscus)EoasaphiscusEoasaphus (=Anorina)EobronteusEocatuniellaEochatianaEocheirurusEochuangiaEocorynexochusEocryphopsEoctenopygeEocyphiniumEocyrtosymboleEodalmanitinaEodindymeneEodiscus (=Deltadiscus)EodontopleuraEodouposiellaEodrevermanniaEofallotaspisEoharpes (=Harpina)Eohomalonotus (=Brongniartia)EoinouyiaEoisotelusEokaninia (=Kaniniella)EokaolishaniaEokaotaiaEokochaspisEokosovopeltis (=Heptabronteus)Eoleonaspis (=Bojokoralaspis)EolotagnostusEomalungiaEomansuyiaEomicrophillipsiaEomonorachusEopalpebraliaEophacops (=Bullicephalus)EopharostomaEopiriproetusEoproetusEopsEoptychaspisEoredlichia (=Archaeops; =Galloredlichia; = Pararedlichia)EorobergiaEoryctocephalusEosaukia (=Scolosaukia)EoscutellumEoshengia (=Baojingia)EoshumardiaEosoproetusEosoptychopariaEospenciaEotaitzuiaEotingocephalusEotrinucleusEowinterbergiaEowuhuiaEozacanthoidesEpEpumeriaErErbenaspisErbeniaErbenicorypheErbenitesErbenochileErbia (=Paratollaspis)ErbiellaErbinaErbiopsidellaErbiopsisErdeliaErdoraditesErediaspisEremiproetus (=Dufresnoyiproetus)ErixaniumErkelinaErmanellaErratencrinurusErratobalticusErratojincellaErzishania (=Oreisator)

EsEsseiganiaEstaingia (=Hsuaspis)EstoniitesEstoniopsEtEteraspisEtheridgaspisEuEuarthricocephalusEudolatitesEuduploraEugonocareEujinnaniaEuleiostegiumEuloma (=Calymenopsis)EulomellaEulominaEuonchonotinaEuptychaspisEurekiaEurostinaEurycareEvEvagenaEvansaspisEvenkaspisEvropeitesEwEwacasteExExallaspisExastipyxExcetraExigua (=Brassicicephalus)ExochopsExtraniaEyEymekops (=Kolpura)

EzEzhimiaEzhuangia F 

FaFabulaspisFaciuraFailleana (=Opsypharus)FalanaspisFallotaspidellaFallotaspisFamatinolithusFandianaspisFastigaspisFeFeilongshaniaFeistiaFenestraspisFengduiaFenghuangella (=Cyclolorenzellina)FengtieniaFenniopsFerenepeaFerralsiaFeruminopsFiFialoidesFieldaspisFinecrestiaFissanomocarellaFissocephalusFlFlabellocephalusFlectihystricurusFlexicalymeneFlexidechenellaFlexiscutellumFoFollicepsForchammeriaFordaspisForillonariaFormoniaFormosocephalusForteyopsFouloniaFoveatellaFrFragiscutumFrammiaFrancenaspisFranconicaboleFrancovichiaFremontellaFrencrinuroidesFrithjofiaFritzolenellusFrognaspisFuFuchouia (=Parafuchouia; =Pseudofuchouia)FuminaspisFuquaniaFuracopygeFurcalithusFuriaFuscinipygeFuyuniaFuzhouwania G 

GaGabriceraurusGabriellusGalahetesGalbagnostusGalbertianus (="Hollardia") GaleaspisGalerosaukiaGallagnostusGamonedaspisGangdeeriaGaninellaGanovexopyge (=Scottia)GaoloupingiaGaotanaspisGaotaniaGapeevellaGaphuraspisGarbiellaGaspelichasGastropolus (=Lisogoraspis)

GdGdowiaGeGedongaspisGeesopsGeigiboleGelaseneGenalaticurusGenevievella (=Placosema; =Nixonella; =Torridella)GentilapsisGeorhithronellaGeracephalinaGeragnostellaGeragnostus (=Geratrinodus; =Neptunagnostella)GeraldinellaGerasaphesGerastos (=Dohmiella; =Kegeliella)Geyerorodes (=Orodes)

GhGhwaiellaGiGibscherellaGigantopygusGignopeltisGigoutellaGiordanellaGirandiaGirvanopyge (=Cremastoglottos; =Gamops; =Nanlingia)GitarraGlGlaberagnostus (=Toragnostus)GlabrellaGlabretinaGladiatoriaGlaphurellaGlaphurinaGlaphurusGlaphyraspis (=Raaschella)GlobampyxGlobulaspisGlobusiaGlobusiellaGlobusoideaGloriaGlossicephalusGlossopleura (=Sonoraspis)GlyphanellusGlyphaspellusGlyphaspis (=Americare)GlyphopeltisGlyptagnostus (=Barrandagnostus)  GlyptambonGlyptometopsisGlyptometopusGoGogGogiuraGogoellaGolasaphusGoldillaenoidesGoldillaenusGomiitesGoniagnostusGonicheirurusGoniophrysGonioteloidesGonzaloiaGorskiaGoumenziaGourdoniaGoycoiaGrGracemereaGracilocorypheGrandagnostusGrandioculus (=Honania)GranitziaGranolenusGranularaspis (=Granularia)GranuloagnostusGranutaspisGratagnostusGravicalymeneGreenopsGriffithidellaGriffithidesGrinnellaspis (=Actinopeltis)GriphasaphusGroenwalliaGroenwallinaGrossoproetusGruetiaGuGuancenshaniaGuandacolithusGuangnaniaGuangxiaspisGuangyuanaspisGuangyuaniaGuankouiaGudralisiumGuicheniaGuilinaspisGuizhouanomocareGuizhoucephalinaGuizhouhystricurusGuizhoupliomeropsGuluheiaGunnia (=Ellotia; =Yiliangaspis)GuohongjuniaGuoziaGuraspisGushanaspisGyGymnagnostusGymnostomixGyrometopus H 

HaHaasia (=Yuanjia)HabrocephalusHadragnostus (=Formosagnostus; =Kunshanagnostus)HadraspisHadrocephalitesHadrohybusHadrokraspedonHadromerosHadrorachusHagioritesHahnus (=Eometopus)HaliplanktosHallandclarkeopsHallantaHamashaniaHamatolenusHamiroproetusHammannopygeHamptonellaHanburiaHanchungolithus (=Ichangolithus; =Yinjiangolithus)HancraniaHanivellaHaniwaHaniwoides (=Yuepingia)HanjiangaspisHanshaniaHanzhongaspisHapalopleuraHapsiceraurusHapsidocareHarataspisHardyiaHardyoides (=Norwoodina)Harpes (=Helioharpes; =Reticuloharpes)Harpidella (=Rhinotarion)HarpidesHarpidoidesHarpillaenusHarringtonacasteHartellaHartshilliaHartshillinaHassiaboleHastagnostusHastiremopleuridesHatangiaHawkinsaspis (=Hawkinsia)HawleiaHazaraniaHeHebediscina (=Szechuanaspis; =Zhenbadiscus)HebediscusHebeiaHedinaspisHedstroemia (=Milesdavis; =Pachyproetus)HejinaspisHelepagetiaHelieranellaHeliomeraHeliomeroidesHelioproetusHeliopyge (=Alcaldops)HelmutiaHelokybeHemiarges (=Choneilobarges)HemibarrandiaHemicricometopusHemikaolishaniaHemirhodonHenadopariaHentigiaHeraspisHercantyxHerseHesaHessleridesHeterocaryonHeterocyclopyge (=Selenoptychus)HeukkyoellaHeweniaHexacopygeHexacostaHiHibbertia (=Harpesoides; =Metaharpes; =Paraharpes; =Thorslundops; =Wegelinia)HicksiaHidascutellumHighgatellaHildaphillipsiaHillyardina (=Metabowmania)HindermeyeriaHintzecurusHintzeiaHispaniaspisHistiomonaHoHoekaspiellaHoekaspisHoffetellaHolanshaniaHolasaphusHolcacephalusHoldenia (=Tiresias)Holia (=Ainoa)Hollardops (=Modellops; =Philipsmithiana)HolmdaliaHolmia (=Esmeraldina)HolmiellaHolocephalina (=Carausia)HolocephalitesHolotrachelusHoloubkocheilusHolteriaHolubaspis (=Holubia)HolyoakiaHomagnostoidesHomagnostusHomalonotusHomalopteonHomalopygeHomodictyaHomolichasHonanaspisHongjunshaoiaHongshiyanaspisHoplolichas (=Cyranolichas)HoplolichoidesHorbusoniaHoronastesHoumaiaHoumengiaHousia (=Housiella)HowelluellaHoytaspisHsHsiaellaHsiaoshiaHsuchuangiaHuHuaibeiaHuainaniaHualongellaHualongiaHuamiaocephalusHuangnigangiaHuangshiaspisHuaquinchaiaHuayuaniaHuemacaspisHuenickenolithusHuilichiaHukasawaiaHumaencrinuroidesHumeiaHumilogriffithidesHunanaspisHunanolenusHunanoproetusHunanopygeHundwarella (=Anomocaraspis)Hungaia (=Acrohybus)Hungioides (=Argentinops)HunjiangaspisHunjiangitesHunnanocephalusHunnebergiaHuntoniatonia (=Huntonia)HuochengellaHuochengiaHupeiaHupeolenusHupetinaHuzhuiaHwHwangjuellaHyHyboaspisHydrocephalus (=Phlysacium; =Rejkocephalus)Hypagnostus (=Cyclopagnostus; =Breviagnostus; =Metahypagnostus)HypaproetusHyperbolochilusHypermecaspis (=Spitsbergaspis)HyperopariaHypodicranotusHypsipariopsHyrokybe (=Shiqiania)Hysterolenus (=Hectoria)Hysteropleura (=Apedopyanus)Hystricurus (=Vermilionites)

 I 

IbIberocorypheIbexaspisIbexicurusIcIchangiaIdIdameaIddingsia (=Plataspella)IderiaIdiomesusIdiorhaphaIdiouraIdolagnostusIduiaIgIgarkiellaIglesiellaIgnoproetusIgnotogregatusIjIjacephalusIlIllaenoidesIllaenopsis (=Eurymetopus; =Procephalops; =Rokycania; =Pseudobarrandia)IllaenoscutellumIllaenulaIllaenurusIllaenus (=Cryptonymus; =Actinolobus; =Deucalion; =Svobodapeltis)IlltydaspisInIncaiaIndigestus (=Hybocephalus)Indiligens (=Hospes)InellaInglefieldiaIngriopsIniospheniscusIniotomaInkouia (=Agalatus)InnitagnostusInosacotesInouyellaInouyiaInouyinaInouyopsInoyellaspisInteraliaInterproetusIoIohomiaIolgiaIrIranaspidionIranaspisIranochresteriusIranochuangiaIranoleesia (=Irania; =Heyelingella)IrgitkhemiaIriniaIrvingella (=Irvingellina; =Komaspis)IrvingelloidesIsIsabeliniaIsalauxIsalauxinaIsbergiaIschyrotomaIshpellaIsidreanaIsidrellaIsocolus (=Astyages)Isoprusia (=Mauraspis)IsotellaIsoteloidesIsotelus (=Homotelus)IssafeniellaIsyrakellaIsyrakopeltisItItcheriellaIthycephalusIthyektyphusItydeoisItyophorusIvIvanopleuraIveriaIvshinagnostusIvshinaspisIyIyouellaIzIzarnia J 

JaJakutusJangudaspisJanshinicusJaponoscutellumJasmundiaJasperiaJeJeffersonia (=Bathyurina)Jegorovaia (=Hermosella)JenkinsoniaJessievilliaJiJiagouiaJialaopsisJianchangiaJiangjunshaniaJiangnaniaJiangsuaspisJiangsucephalusJiangsuiaJiangxiaspisJianxilithusJiawangaspisJiiaJimachongiaJimanomocareJimaoshaniaJimbokranionJinanaspisJincellaJingheellaJingxianiaJingyangiaJiniaJinshaellaJinxiaspisJiubaspisJiumeniaJiuquaniaJiuxiella (=Miboshania)JiwangshaniaJixianaspisJixianella (=Jixiania)

JoJohntempleiaJonotusJosephulusJosinaJuJubileiaJucundaspisJudaiellaJudomiaJudomiellaJujuyaspis (=Alimbetaspis)JujuyopsJuliaspisJunggarellaJuraspisJuriietella K 

KaKabuqiiaKabutocraniaKadyellaKailiaKailiellaKainellaKainellinaKainelloidesKainisiliellinaKainopsKaipingellaKaltykelinaKameschkoviellaKaninia (=Kaniniella; =Dolgaia)KaniniellaKanlingiaKannoriellaKanoshiaKaolishaniaKaolishaniellaKaotaiaKaragandoidesKarataspisKarginellaKarslanus (Ariaspis)KasachstanaspisKasachstaniaKasatchaspisKaskiaKassiniusKathleenellaKathryniaKathwaiaKatuniaKatunicareKaufmannella (=Kaufmannia)Kawina (=Cydonocephalus)Kazachius (="Elegantaspis") KayseraspisKayseropsKazelia (=Kazellina)

KeKeeleaspisKeguqiniaKeilapygeKeithiaKeithiellaKendallina (=Kendallia)KennacryphaeusKepingaspisKepisisKepisisKerfornellaKermanellaKerpenellaKettneraspis (=Grossia)Ketyna (=Kujandaspis)

KhKhalfinellaKharausnuricaKiKielanellaKielania (=Lowtheria)KijanellaKilmahogiaKindbladiaKinderlaniaKingaspidoides (=Elatius)Kingaspis (=Mesetaia)KingstonellaKingstonia (=Ucebia)KingstonioidesKiowaiaKirenginaKirkdominaKiskinellaKistocareKitatellaKiyakius (="Pionaspis") 

KjKjerulfiaKlKlabaviaKleptothuleKlimaxocephalusKlotziellaKloucekiaKnKnechteliaKoKobayashellaKobayashiaKobayashipeltisKobdusKochaspisKochiella (=Eiffelaspis)KochiellinaKochinaKodymaspisKogeniumKoksorenusKokuriaKolbaspisKolbinellaKoldiniaKoldiniellaKoldinioidia (=Akoldinioidia)KolihapeltisKollarcephalusKolpuraKolymellaKolymoproetusKomaspidella (=Buttsina; =Ataktaspis)KomaspisKoneprusiaKoneprusitesKontrastinaKootenia (=Notasaphus)Kooteniella (=Babakovia)KooteniellinaKooteninaKoptura (=Parakoptura)KopungiellaKoraipsisKormagnostus (=Kormagnostella; =Litagnostoides)KoroboviaKosovopeltis (=Heptabronteus)KosovoproetusKotuiaKotysopeltisKounamkitesKozlowskiaspisKrKrambedrysiaKrattaspisKrohboleKrolinaKtKtenouraKuKuanyangiaKueichowiaKujandinaKuljumbinaKulmiellaKulmogriffithidesKunmingaspis (=Benxiaspis)KunshanaspisKuraspisKuraspoidesKuruktagaspisKutsingocephalusKwKweichowillaKyKymagnostusKymataspisKyphocephalus L 

LaLabiostrellaLabiostrina (=Abia)Labradoria (=Sinolenus)LabradorinaLachnostomaLacorsalinaLacunoporaspisLaethoprusiaLaeviboleLajishanaspisLakaspisLamanskytesLaminurusLamproscutellumLancastria (=Changaspis; =Chienaspis; =Goldfieldia; =Paraoryctocephalops; =Pseudolancastria)LandyiaLaneitesLanggonboleLanggoniaLangqiaLangyashaniaLaoyingshaniaLapidariaLardeuxiaLarifugulaLasaguaditasLasarchopygeLashushaniaLatecephalusLateulomaLatiboleLaticephalusLaticorypheLatiglobusiaLatikingaspisLatilorenzella (=Wuania)LatipalaeolenusLatiproetusLatiredlichiaLatouchiaLatuzellaLauchellumLaudoniaLauzonellaLavadamiaLazarenkiuraLeLecanoaspisLecanopleuraLecanopygeLehuaLeiagnostus (=Ciceragnostus)LeiaspisLeichneyellaLeichuangiaLeimitziaLeiobienvilliaLeiocorypheLeiolichasLeioscutellumLeioshumardiaLeiosteginaLeiostegium (=Endocrania)LeiostrototropisLejopygeLemdadellaLenacareLenadiscusLenagraulosLenallinaLenaspisLeningraditesLeocephalusLeoforteyiaLeonaspis (=Acanthaloma)LepidoproetusLeptochilodiscus (=Kerberodiscus)LeptochuangiaLeptopilusLeptoplastides (=Andesaspis; =Beltella; =Chunkingaspis; =Parabolinopsis; =Rampartaspis)LeptoplastusLeptoredlichia (=Paraleptoredlichia)LermontoviaLermontoviellaLetniitesLeurostegaLeviceraurusLeviniaLevisaspisLevisellaLevisiaLiLianglangshaniaLiangshanocephalusLianhuashaniaLiaoningaspisLiaoningellaLiaotropisLiaoyangaspisLibertellaLichakephalusLichanocorypheLichapyge (=Macropygella)Lichas (=Apolichas; =Autolichas)LichengaspisLichengiaLichokephalinaLicnocephala (=Domina)LiexiaspisLigiscusLimatacepsLimbadiscus (=Natalina) LimbocalymeneLimniphacosLimouolenusLimpeinaLinguagnostus (=Cristagnostus)LinguaphillipsiaLinguaproetusLinguchuangiaLinguisaukiaLingukainellaLinguocalymeneLingyuanaspisLioboleLiobolinaLiocalymeneLiocareLiocnemisLioharpes (=Fritchaspis)LiokooteniaLiolalax (=Lalax)LiolophopsLiomegalaspidesLioparella (=Zhuozishania)Lioparia (=Lorentzia)LiopeishaniaLiopeltaLiosolenopleuraLiostracinaLiquaniaLiriamnicaLisania (=Aojia)Lisogoragnostus (=Abagnostus; =Scanagnostus)Lisogorites (=Trigonoaspis; =Tangyaia)ListroaLitaspisLitavkaspisLitocephalusLitomatopusLitometopusLitotixLiuheaspisLiushuicephalusLiwia (=Livia)

LlLlandovacasteLlanoaspidellaLlanoaspisLloydiaLloydolithusLoLochkovellaLochmanaspisLochmanolenellusLodeniciaLoeipygeLoganellus (=Highgatea)LoganopeltisLoganopeltoidesLohanpopsisLomsucaspisLonchinouyiaLonchobasilicus (=Sinomegalaspis)Lonchocephalus (=Bucksella)LonchodomasLonchopygellaLongduiaLongiandaLongicorypheLongilobusLongiproetusLonglingaspisLongmenshaniaLongshaniaLongxianaspisLongxumeniaLoparellaLopeulomaLophiokephalionLophodesellaLophoholcusLophosaukiaLopnoritesLordshilliaLorensellaLorenzellaLoriellaLorrettinaLoshanellaLotagnostusLotosoidesLotzeiaLoulaniaLoxonepeaLoxopariaLoxopeltisLuLuaspidesLuaspisLugalellaLuguoiaLuhopsLuiaLuliangshanaspisLulongiaLunacephalusLunacrania (=Paranumia)LunolenusLuojiashaniaLuonanocephalusLuotuolingiaLusampaLusatiops (=Jalonella)LutesvilliaLuvsanodiscusLuxellaLuyanhaoaspis (=Luaspis)LuyanhaoiaLyLycophronLydiaspisLygdozoonLynaspisLyralichasLyrapygeLyriaspis M 
 

MaMacannaiaMacellouraMachairagnostusMackenziurusMacnairidesMacroblepharumMacroboleMacrogrammusMacronoda (=Promesus)Macropyge (=Haniwapyge)MacrotoxusMadaoyuitesMadaraspisMadarocephalusMadianaspisMaduiyaMagnacephalusMagnommaMahaiellaMaiaspisMajiangiaMakbelaspisMaladiaMaladioidella (=Kuruktagella; =Cedarellus)MaladioidesMaladiopsisMalayaproetusMalchiMalimanaspis (=Goodsiraspis)MalinaspisMalladaiaMallagnostus (=Ladadiscus; ?=Jinghediscus)MalongocephalusMalongullia (=Ampyxinops)MalvinellaMalvinocooperellaMalykaniaManailinaManaspisManchuriellaManchurocephalusManitouellaMannopygeMansiellaMansuyellaMansuyiaMansuyites (=Parapalacorona)MantoushaniaManublesiaMaopingaspisMaotuniaMapaniaMapanopsisMarcaisiaMarcouellaMarekolithusMarjumiaMarkhaspisMarrolithoidesMarrolithusMaryvilliaMaspakitesMataniaMataninellaMaurotarion (=Goniopleura; =Branisella; =Tricornotarion)MaximovellaMayiellaMeMeadowtownellaMecophyrsMegadundabergiaMegagnostusMegagraulosMegalaspidellaMegalaspides (=Lannacus)MegalisaniaMegalopsisMegapalaeolenusMegapharanaspisMegaproetusMegasaphusMegatemnouraMegistaspidella (=Spinopyge)Megistaspis (=Megalaspis; =Megistaspinus; =Rhinaspis)MeisteraspisMeisterellaMeitanellaMeitaniaMeitanillaenusMeitanopsisMelopetasusMemmatellaMendodiscusMendogaspisMendolaspisMendosinaMendospidellaMeneghinellaMeneviella (=Menevia)MengziaMeniscocorypheMeniscuchusMenneraspisMenocephalites (=Parataitzuia)MenocephalusMenomonia (=Densonella; =Millardia)MenopariaMenorcaspisMephiargesMerebolinaMeridioscutellumMerliniaMeropallaMeroperixMesoctenopygeMesolenellusMesonacis (=Fremontia)MesotaphraspisMetaacidaspisMetabalangiaMetacalvinellaMetacalymeneMetacanthina   MetacryphaeusMetadoxides (=Anadoxides)MetagraulosMetaharpidesMetakooteniaMetaleiolichasMetalichasMetalioparellaMetalisaniaMetalonchodomasMetanomocareMetanomocarellaMetaphillipsiaMetapianaspisMetapilekiaMetapliomeropsMetaprodamesellaMetaptychopygeMetaredlichiaMetarthricocephalusMetascutellumMetashantungiaMetayuepingiaMeteoraspis (=Greylockia; =Coleopachys)MetisaspinaMetisaspisMetisellaMetopolichas (=Metopias; =Holoubkovia; =Macroterolichas)MetopotropisMexicaspisMexicellaMiMiaeulomaMialMianxianellaMiaobanpoiaMiaopopsisMicagnostusMicangshaniaMichaspisMicmaccaMicmaccopsisMicragnostusMicragraulosMicrodiscusMicroparia (=Gallagnostoides)MicrophillipsiaMicroryctocaraMicroscutellumMicrospatulinaMictosaukiaMictosaukioidiaMilaspisMimanaMimocryphaeusMindycrustaMinicephalusMinkellaMinupeltisMinusinellaMioptychopygeMiraboleMiraculaspisMirandaMiranellaMiraspis (=Elbaspis)MiriproetusMischynogoritesMisszhouiaMitchellaspis (=Mitchellia)

MoModocia (=Armonia; =Metisia; =Perioura; =Semnocephalus)MohicanaMonanocephalusMonkaspis (=Kushanopyge; =Paraliaoningaspis)MonocheilusMonodechenellaMonorakosMonosulcatinaMopanshaniaMoravocorypheMorgatiaMorocconitesMorocconus (=Cephalopyge)MorosaMoschoglossisMoxomiaMrMrakibinaMrassinaMuMuchattellinaMucronaspis (=Guaykinites)MufushaniaMukraniaMulciberaspisMummaspisMundocephalinaMungyongiaMunijaMyMyindaMyindellaMyoproetusMyopsolenus (=Collyrolenus)MyopsostrenuaMyrmecomimusMystrocephalaMytocephala (=Mirops)MyttoniaN

NaNadiyellaNagaproetusNahannagnostusNahanniaNahannicephalusNamanoiaNambeetellaNamiolenoidesNamuraspisNamuropyge (=Coignouina)NandanaspisNangaocephalusNangaoiaNangaopsNanillaenusNankinolithusNannopeltisNanoqiaNanshanaspisNanshihmeniaNaraoiaNarinosaNasocephalusNassoviaNatmusNaustiaNeNebidellaNehanniaspisNeilsoniellaNeimonggolaspisNelegeriaNelgakiaNeltneriaNeoacrocephalitesNeoanomocarellaNeoasaphus (=Trematophoris; =Multiasaphus; =Postasaphus; =Subasaphus)NeobigotinaNeoblairella (="Blairella") NeocalmoniaNeocheiruroidesNeochilonorriaNeocobboldia (=Cobboldia; =Margodiscus)NeodamesellaNeodrepanura (="Drepanura") NeoglaphyraspisNeograciella (="Graciella") Neogriffithides (=Siciliproetus)NeohedinaspisNeoiranella (="Iranella") NeokaskiaNeokochinaNeolenusNeolichasNeometacanthusNeoolenusNeopagetina (=Pagetina)NeoparabolinaNeopeltisNeopoliellinaNeoproboliumNeoprodamesellaNeoproetusNeopsilocephalinaNeoredlichiaNeoredlichinaNeoregina (="Regina") NeoscutellumNeoshirakiellaNeosolenopleurellaNeotaenicephalusNepeaNephranommaNephranopsNephrolenellusNericellaNericiaNericiaspisNerudaspisNeseuretinusNeseuretus (=Synhomalonotus)NevadellaNevadiaNganasanella (=Tamaranella)

NgNgaricephalusNiNicoljarviusNidanshaniaNieszkowskiaNilcgnaNilegnaNileoidesNileus (=Remopleuridioides)NinadiscusNinaspisNingkianitesNingkianolithus (=Ceratolithus; =Hexianolithus)NinglangiaNingnanaspisNingqiangaspisNingxiaspisNiobeNiobella (=Metoptogyrus)NiobidesNiobinaNipponargesNipponaspisNipponocalymeneNitidocareNiuchangellaNoNobiliasaphus (=Pamirotchechites)NodicepsNodiphillipsiaNoelaspisNomadinisNorasaphitesNorasaphusNordiaNoriniaNorwoodellaNorwoodia (=Whitfieldina)NotaiellaNotoaphelaspisNotocorypheNotopeltisNovakella (=Incisopyge)NovaspisNovoagnostusNovoameuraNovocatharia (=Catharia)

NuNucleurusNunnaspisNyNyayaNyteropsO

ObObelagnostusObliteraspisObrucheviaspisOcOctillaenusOctobronteus (=Stoermeraspis; =Stoermeria)OculeusOculichasmopsOdOdontocephalusOdontochile (=Hausmannia)OdontopleuraOeOedicybele (=Dindymenella; =Jemtella)OedorhachisOehlertaspis (=Oehlertia)OelandiopsOenonellaOgOgmasaphusOgyginusOgygiocarellaOgygiocarisOgygitellaOgygitesOgygitoidesOgygopsis (=Taxioura)

OhOhleumOiOidalagnostus (=Ovalagnostus)OidalaproetusOinochoeOirotellaOkOkunevaellaOlOlegaspisOlekmanellusOlekmaspisOlenaspellaOlenekellaOlenekinaOlenelloidesOlenellus (=Barrandia)OlenoidesOlenoidestranansOlentellaOlenus (=Simulolenus)OlgaspisOligometopus (=Bernicella)OlimusOlinaspisOmOmegopsOmeipsisOmulioviaOnOnaraspisOncagnostus (=Eurudagnostus)OnchocephalinaOnchocephalitesOnchocephalus (=Litocodia)OnchometopusOnchonotellus (=Onchonotina; =Guotangia; =Seletella)OnchonotopsisOnchonotusOnchopeltisOnniaOnnicalymeneOntoellaOnychopyge (=Prionopyge)OnycopygeOnymagnostus (=Agnostonymus)

OoOodiscusOopsitesOosthuizenellaOpOpipeuterella (=Ompheter; =Opipeuter)OpoaOpsidiscus (=Aulacodiscus)OpsiosoryctocephalusOrOrbitoproetusOrdosaspisOrdosiaOreadellaOrienturusOrkekeiaOrloviaOrloviellaOrmathopsOrmistonaspisOrmistoniaOrmistoniellaOrnamentaspisOrometopusOrphanaspisOrthodorsumOryctocaraOryctocephalinaOryctocephalitesOryctocephaloidesOryctocephalopsOryctocephalus (=Vinakainella)OryctometopusOrygmaspisOrygmatosOsOsceoliaOsekaspisOsmolskiaOtOtarion (=Aulacopleurella; =Conoparia; =Otarionella)OtarionidesOtarozoumOtekmaspisOtodechenellaOttenbyaspisOttoaspisOuOuijjaniaOurikaiaOvOvalocephalus (=Hammatocnemis; =Paratzuchiatocnemis)OvatoryctocaraOxOxyagnostusP

PaPachyaspidellaPachyaspisPachycraniumPachyredlichiaPaciphacopsPacootellaPaedeumiasPaenebeltellaPagetia (=Eopagetia; =Mesopagetia)Pagetides (=Discomesites)PagodiaPagodioidesPagometopusPaiviniaPalacoronaPaladin (=Weberides)Palaeadotes (=Pseudobergeronites)PalaeoharpesPalaeolenellaPalaeolenidesPalaeolenusPalaeolentusPaleonelsonia (=Nelsonia)PalaeophillipsiaPalellaPalemansuyiaPaleodechenellaPaleofossusPaleonelsoniaPaleooryctocephalusPalmerara (=Nyella)PalmeraspisPalmettaspisPalpebraliaPalpebropsPalquiellaPanacusPanarchaeogonusPandaspinapygaPanderia (=Rhodope)Panibole (=Proliobole)PanxinellaPaofeniellusPaokanniaPapillicalymenePapyriaspisParaacidaspisParaantagmusParaaojiaParabadiellaParabailiellaParabarrandiaParabellefontiaParablackwelderiaParabolina (=Odontopyge)ParabolinellaParabolininaParabolinitesParabolinoides (=Bernia)ParabouleiaParabriscoiaParabulbaspisParabumastidesParacalmonia (=Proboloides)ParacalvinellaParacalymeneParacalymenemene (=Paracalymene)Paracedaria (=Pilgrimia)ParaceraurusParachangaspisParachangshaniaParachaunoproetusParacheiruroidesParachittidilla (=Amurticephalus)Paracoosia (=Manchurocephalus)Paracrocephalites (=Arctaspis)ParacryphaeusParacybantyxParacybeloidesParadamesella (=Falkopingia)ParadechenellaParadictyitesParadionideParadoxides (=Vinicella)ParaencrinurusParaenshiaParaeosoptychopariaParaerbiaParaeremiproetusParafallotaspisParafrithjofiaParagangdeeriaParaglobusiaParagraulosParagriffithidesParagunniaParaharpidesParahawleiaParahomalonotusParahousiaParahuainaniaParahystricurusParaichangiaParainouyiaParajialaopsisParakailiaParakaolishaniaParakoldiniaParakoldinioidia (=Macroculites; =Missisquoia; =Rhamphopyge; =Tangshanaspis)ParakomaspisParakotuiaParalardeuxiaParalbertellaParaleiolichasParaleiostegiumParalejurusParalepidoproetusParalevisiaParalisaniellaParalorenzangella (=Paralorenzella)ParalorenzellaParamaladioidellaParamalungiaParamansuyella (=Paramansuyia)ParamapaniaParamecephalus (=Parahiolites)Paramegalaspis (=Dolerasaphus)Paramegistaspis (=Varvaspis)Paramenocephalites (=Solenoparina)ParamenomoniaParamgaspisParamicmaccaParamicropariaParamiraboleParampyxParanevadellaParangustiboleParanileusParanomocareParanomocarellaParanorwoodiaParaojiaParaolenoidesParaolenusParaonychopygeParaorloviaParapachyaspisParapagetia (=Planodiscus)ParapalpebraliaParapaokanniaParapeishaniaParaperiommaParaphelaspisParaphillipsiaParaphillipsinella (=Phillipsella; =Protophillipsinella)ParaphorocephalaParapilekiaParaplagiuraParaplesiagraulosParaplethopeltisParaplicatolinaParapliomeraParapoliellaParaporilorenzellaParapoulseniaParaproetusParaprotolenellaParaptychopygeParaqingshuiheella (=Qingshuiheella)Pararaia (=Proichangia; =Tannuolaspis)ParasajanaspisParashantungiaParashengiaParashuiyuellaParashumardiaParasolenopariaParasolopleurena (=Parasolenopleura)Parasphaerexochus (=Mayopyge)ParaszechuanellaParatamdaspisParatermierellaParatiresiasParatretaspisParatrinucleusParatungusellaParawarburgellaParawuaniaParawutingaspisParaxenocephalusParayabeiaParayiliangellaParayinitesParayoungia (=Ichiyamella)ParayuepingiaParazhenbaspisParazhongtiaoshanaspisParaziboaspisPardailhaniaParehmania (=Mcnairia; =Rowia; =Thompsonaspis)PareopsPareuloma (=Gansucephalina)ParevenkaspisParillaenusParisoceraurusParkaspisParkesolithusParticepsParvidumusParvigenaParyfenus (=Colymbus)PatalolaspisPateraspisPatomaspisPatronaspisPauciellaPaulicepsPePeachellaPearylandiaPeculicephalinaPedinaspisPedinocephalinaPedinocephalitesPedinocephalusPedinocoryphePedinodechenellaPedinopariopsPegelinaPeichiashaniaPeishaniaPeishanoidesPelicephalusPelitlinaPelmanaspisPeltabellia (=Biolgina)PeltocarePeltura (=Anthes; =Anopocare)PelturinaPemphigaspis (=Hallaspis)Penarosa (=Trinepea)PenchiopsisPennaiaPeracheilus (=Acheilus)PerakaspisPeraspisPeratagnostus (=Monaxagnostus)PeregrinaspisPerexigupygePerforinaPeriallaspisPericopygePerimetopusPeriommaPeriommellaPerirehaedulusPerischoclonusPerischodoryPerissopliomeraPerissopygePerliproetusPerneraspis (=Perneria)PeronopsellaPeronopsis (=Mesagnostus; =Euagnostus; =Acadagnostus; =Axagnostus; =Itagnostus)Perrector (=Rawops)PerryusPerthiellusPerunaspis (=Nitidulopyge)PesaiaPesaiellaPesaiinaPetalocephalusPetigurusPetrbokiaPetruninaspisPhPhacopidella (=Glockeria)PhacopidinaPhacopinaPhacopsPhaetonellusPhalacroma (=Platagnostus)Phalagnostus (=Phalacromina)PhalangocephalusPhaldagnostusPhanoptes (=Eccaparadoxides; =Macrocerca)Pharostomina (=Colpocoryphoides)PhaseolopsPhillibolePhillibolinaPhilliboloides (=Phillibolina)PhillipsiaPhillipsinellaPhilonyxPhoidagnostusPhoreotropisPhorocephala (=Carrickia)PhylacopsPhylacterus (=Liostracinoides)PhyllaspisPhymaspisPhysemataspisPiPianaspisPiazellaPichuniaPichyklenPichynturiaPileaspisPilekiaPiliolitesPilletinaPiltoniaPinarella (=Pensacola)PinctusPingluaspisPingluiaPingquania (=Oxygonaspis)PiochaspisPiriformaPiriproetoidesPiriproetusPjPjatkovaspellusPlPlacopariaPlacoparinaPlaesiacomiaPlagiolariaPlagiura (=Ruichengella; =Plagiurella)PlakhinellaPlanaspisPlanilobusPlaniscutellum (=Protoscutellum)PlanocephalusPlanokaskiaPlanolimbusPlasiaspisPlatillaenusPlatyantyxPlatycalymene (=Sulcocalymene)Platycoryphe (=Liangshanaspis)PlatydiamesusPlatylichas (=Lingucephalichas)PlatylisaniaPlatypeltoides (=Platypeltis)PlatyptychopygePlatysaukiaPlatyscutellumPlebiellusPlectasaphusPlecteulomaPlectrellaPlectriferPlectrocraniaPlesiagraulosPlesiamecephalusPlesigangdeeriaPlesiociliaPlesioconvexaPlesioinouyellaPlesiomalvinellaPlesionevadiaPlesioparabolinaPlesioperiommaPlesiowensusPlesiowuaniaPlesisolenopariaPlesiyuepingiaPlethopeltellaPlethopeltidesPlethopeltis (=Plethometopus; =Enontioura)Plethopeltoides (=Kulyumbopeltis)PleurinodusPleuroctenium (=Dichagnostus)PlicatolinaPlicatolinellaPliomera (=Amphion)PliomerellaPliomerellusPliomeridiusPliomerina (=Pliomeraspis)PliomeroidesPliomeropsPlurinodusPlutonides (=Plutonia)

PoPodoliproetusPodowrinellaPogrebovitesPokrovskayaspisPokrovskiellaPoletaevellaPoletaeviaPoliella (=Bornemannia)PoliellaspidellaPoliellaspisPoliellinaPoliticurusPolitinellaPolliaxisPolyariellaPolycertaspisPolycyrtaspisPolydinotesPolypleuraspisPompeckiaPontipalpebraliaPopigaiaPopovkiaspisPopovkitesPoriagraulosPorilorenzella (=Jinnania)PoriplethopeltisPoronileusPoroscutellumPortentosusPorterfieldiaPortlockiaPoshaniaPostfallotaspisPoulsenellaPoulseniaPoulseniellaPrPradesiaPradoellaPraecopariaPraedechenellaPraepatokephalusPragolithusPragoproetusPrantlia (=Malvernocare)PratungusellaPrehousiaPreodontochilePresbynileus (=Paranileus)PrestaliaPribyliaPriceaspis (=Fitzroyaspis)Pricyclopyge (=Bicyclopyge)PrimaspisPrimoriellaPrincetonella (=Calyptomma)Prionocheilus (=Pharostoma)Prionopeltis (=Phaetonides; =Phaeton)Proagnostus (=Agnostascus; =Paragnostascus)ProampyxProapatokephaloidesProapatokephalopsProasaphiscinaProasaphiscusProasaphusProavusProbilacunaspisProbolichasProbolopsProbowmaniaProbowmaniella (=Proshantungaspis)ProbowmanopsProceratocephala (=Drummuckaspis)ProceratopygeProchuangiaProdalmanitinaProdamesella (=Metaprodamesella; =Neoprodamesella)ProdiacorypheProdikelocephalitesProdontochileProdrevermanniaProehmaniellaProerbiaProetidesProetinaProetocephalusProetopeltisProetus (=Euproetus; =Aeonia; =Devonoproetus; =Falcatoproetus; =Forbesia; =Scotoproetus; =Trigonaspis)ProfallotaspisProhedinaspisProhedinellaProhedinia (=Tosotychia)ProinouyiaProkooteniaProkopsProliaoningaspisProliostracusProlloydiaProlonchocephalusPromacropyge (=Aksapyge)PromegalaspidesPromeitaniaPrometeoraspisProphysemataspisProricephalusProrommaProsaukia (=Stenosaukia)ProscharyiaProsocephalusProsopiscusProspectatrixProstrixProsymphysurusProtacanthinaProtagraulosProtaitzehoiaProtaldonaiaProtarchaeogonusProtemnites (=Prismenaspis)Proteuloma (=Mioeuloma)ProtobronteusProtocalymeneProtocerauroidesProtochittidillaProtocyphaspidesProtoencrinurellaProtohediniaProtoincaiaProtolenellaProtolenoidesProtolenus (=Bergeronia; =Matthewlenus)ProtolloydolithusProtopelturaProtopliomerellaProtopliomerops (=Stototropis)Protopresbynileus (=Pseudonileus)ProtoptychopygeProtoryctocephalusProtostyginaProtrachopariaProtypus (=Bicaspis)ProuktaspisProveedoriaProxiniobeProzacanthoidesPruvostinoidesPsPsalaspisPsalikilopsisPsalikilusPscemiaspisPsephosthenaspis (=Ludvigsenella)PseudacrocephalaspinaPseudagnostina (=Litagnostus; =Plethagnostus; =Pseudagnostus; =Rhaptagnostus; =Sulcatagnostus; =Xestagnostus)PseudamphotonPseudampyxinaPseudanomocarinaPseudaphelaspisPseudatopsPseudeugonocarePseudichangia (=Zhuxiella; =Sematiscus; =Strenax)PseudinouyiaPseudoacrocephalitesPseudoasaphinusPseudoasaphoidesPseudoasaphusPseudoasiatellaPseudobasilicoidesPseudobasilicusPseudobasiliellaPseudobasiloidesPseudobirmanites (=Madygenia)PseudoblackwelderiaPseudobollandiaPseudocalvinellaPseudocalymene (=Eucalymene)PseudocheirurusPseudoclelandiaPseudocobboldiaPseudocrepicephalusPseudocryphaeusPseudocybelePseudocyrtosymbolePseudodechenella (=Arcticormistonia)PseudodipharusPseudoduduPseudoeobronteusPseudoerbiaPseudoerbiopsisPseudoeteraspisPseudogerastosPseudoglyptagnostus (=Glyptagnostotes)PseudogriphasaphusPseudogygitesPseudohysterolenusPseudohystricurusPseudojudomiaPseudokadyellaPseudokainella (=Elkanaspis; =Parakainella; =Fatocephalus)PseudokingstoniaPseudokoldinellaPseudokoldiniaPseudokoldinioidiaPseudoleiostegiumPseudolenusPseudoleviniaPseudoliostracina (=Emmrichella; =Liaoyangaspis)PseudoliostracusPseudolorenzellaPseudomaladioidesPseudomapaniaPseudomegalaspisPseudomeraPseudomexicellaPseudonericellaPseudoolenoidesPseudopaokanniaPseudopetigurusPseudophillipsiaPseudoplesiagraulosPseudopliomeraPseudoproetusPseudoprotolenellaPseudoptychopygePseudoptyocephalusPseudoredlichiaPseudoresseropsPseudorhaptagnostus (=Neoagnostus; =Euplethagnostus; =Hyperagnostus; =Tarayagnostus; =Calagnostus)PseudosalteriaPseudosaratogiaPseudosarkiaPseudosaukiaPseudosaukiandaPseudosilesiopsPseudosolenopariaPseudosolenopleuraPseudospatulinaPseudosphaerexochus (=Zethus)PseudostyginaPseudotaishaniaPseudotaitzuiaPseudotalbotinaPseudotermierellaPseudotrinodusPseudotupolichas (=Arctinuroides)PseudowaribolePseudowentsuiaPseudowutingaspisPseudoyiliangellaPseudoyuepingia (=Iwayaspis; =Sayramaspis)PseudozacanthopsisPsilacellaPsilocaraPsilocephalinaPsilocephalinella (=Psilocephalus; =Psilocephalina; =Borthaspis)PsilocephalopsPsilostracusPsychopygePtPtarmiganiaPtarmiganoidesPterocephalia (=Pterocephalus; =Hederacauda)PterocephalinaPterocephalopsPterocephalopsinus (=Pterocephalops)PterocoryphePteropariaPteroredlichia (=Spinoredlichia)PterygometopusPtilillaenusPtychagnostus (=Acidusus?)Ptychaspis (=Asioptychaspis)PtychometopusPtychoparella (=Eoptychoparia; =Syspacephalus; =Elrathina)Ptychoparia (=Agraulopsis; =Ptychoparioides)Ptychoparopsis (=Berabichia)Ptychopleurites (=Ptychopleura; =Aposolenopleura; =Punctularia)PtychopygePtyctolorenzellaPtyocephalus (=Kirkella)

PuPuanellaPuanocephalusPudoproetus (=Zhifangia)PugilatorPugionicaudaPulcherproetusPulchricapitus (=Reaganaspis)PulvillaspisPumilinaPunctaspisPunillaspisPunkaPusillabolePyPyraustocraniumPyrimetopusPytinePyttstrigisQ

QiQiandongaspisQiannanagraulosQiaodiellaQiaotingaspisQiaotouaspisQijiangiaQilianaspisQilianshaniaQingkouia (=Paradrepanuroides)QingshuiheiaQingshuihellaQingzhenaspisQinlingiaQuQuadrahomagnostusQuadratapygeQuadratillaenusQuadratispinaQuadratoproetusQuadropsQuandraspisQuebecaspisQuerandiniaQuinquecostaQuitacetraQuitaliaQuyuaniaR

RaRaaschellinaRabienopsRabuloproetusRabutinaRadiaspis (=Xanionurus; =Charybdaspis)Radiolichas (=Diplolichas; =Septidenta)RadiopygeRadioscutellumRadiurusRadnoriaRaduginellaRaerinproetusRananasusRandayniaRandicephalusRanunculoproetusRaphioampyxRaphiophorusRaragnostusRasettaspisRasettia (=Platycolpus)RatinkaspisRawlinsellaRaymondaspis (=Warburgella)Raymondella (=Reedaspis)Raymondina (=Raymondia)RaymonditesReReacalymeneRealaspisRectifrontinellaRedlichaspis (=Lisaniella)Redlichia (=Hoeferia; =Mesodema; =Dongshania)RedlichinaRedlichopsReediellaReedocalymeneReedolithusReedopsReedusRegiusReillopleuraRemacutangerRemizitesRemopleurellaRemopleuridesRemopleuridiellaRencuniaRenhuaiaRenniellaRepinaellaRepinaspisReraspisResimopsisResseraspisResseriaResseropsResseropsisRetamaspisReubenellaReuscholithusReussianaRhRhadinopleuraRhaxeros (=Rhax)RheicopsRhenocynproetusRhenogriffidesRhenopsRhinoferus (=Lawiaspis; =Ropschiaspis)RhinophacopsRhinoreedopsRhodonaspisRhombampyxRhyssometopusRiRichardsonaspisRichardsonella (=Lakella; =Protapatokephalus)RichterargesRichteraspisRichterellaRichterops (=Marsaisia)RimouskiaRinaRinconaspisRinconiaRinellaRitellaRoRobergiaRobergiellaRobroyiaRochaevaRogersvilliaRoksaspisRokycanocorypheRolliaRollmopsRomanopsRoncelliaRondocephalusRongxiellaRontrippiaRorringtonia (=Analocaspis; =Chenaspis; =Trigonoproetus)RosehilliaRossaspisRossicurusRostrifinisRuRuegenometopusRugulites (=Podolites)RuichengaspisRuncinodiscusRunnaniaRussiana (=Scintilla)

RyRyckholtiaS

SaSachaSachaspisSagaviaSagitaspisSagitoidesSaharopsSailomaSailycaspisSaimachiaSaimixiellaSajanaspisSakhaspidellaSalankanaspisSaltaspisSalteriaSalteria (=Errinys)SalterocorypheSalterolithus (=Smeathenia)SambremeuaspisSamgonus (="Lampropeltis") SanaschtykgoliaSanbernardaspisSandoveriaSanduhedinaspisSanduspisSangzhiscutellumSanhuangshaniaSanidopygeSanwaniaSao (=Acanthocnemis; =Acanthogramma)SaonellaSapenionSapushaniaSarassinaSaratogia (=Idahoia; =Meeria)SardaspisSardoredlichiaSarkiaSarrabesiaSaryaspisSaukiaSaukiandaSaukiellaSaukioides (=Pseudosaukia; =Jeholaspis)

ScScabrellaScabriscutellum (=Dicranactis)SceptaspisSchaderthalaspisSchagonariaScharyiaSchismagnostusSchistometopusSchizophillipsiaSchizoproetinaSchizoproetoidesSchizoproetusSchizostylusSchmalenseeiaSchmidtaspisSchmidtiellus (=Schmidtia)SchmidtopsSchohariaSchopfaspisSchoriecareSchoriellaSchoriinaSchyilaspisScinocephalusScopelochasmopsScotiellaScotoharpes (=Aristoharpes; =Selenoharpes)SculptaspisSculptellaSculptoproetusScutellum (=Bronteus; =Brontes; =Goldfussia; =Brontes; =Goldius)

SdSdzuyellaSdzuyomiaSeSectigenaSeisoniaSekwiaspisSeleneceme (=Alsataspis)Selenopeltis (=Languedopeltis; =Polyeres)SelenopeltoidesSeletoidesSelindellaSemadiscusSemagnostusSemicyclocephalusSemiproetusSemisphaerocephalusSeptimopeltisSeriaspisSerksioidesSerraniaSerrodiscus (=Paradiscus)SestrostegaSeverinaSevilliaShShaanxiaShabaellaShahaspisShanchengziellaShanganellaShanghaiaShanghaiaspisShangsiaspisShangtungiaShantungaspisShanxiellaShataniaShengiaShenjiawaniaShergoldiaShergoldinaShickshockiaShidianiaShifangiaShihuigouiaShilengshuiaShipaiellaShiqihepsisShirakiellaShitaiaShivelicusShuangshaniaShuiyuellaShuizuiaShumardiaShumardoella (=Shumardella)ShumardopsSiSibiriaspisSibiriopleuraSichuanolenusSigmakainellaSigmocheilusSignatopsSilesiopsSiligeritesSimaproetusSinampyxinaSinespinaspisSinijanellaSinobathyurusSinoboleSinocoosellaSinocrepicephalusSinocybeleSinocyrtoproetusSinodiscus (=Tologoja)SinoluiaSinopagetiaSinopaladinSinoparapilekiaSinoproceratopygeSinoproetusSinoptychopariaSinosaukiaSinoschistometopusSinosymboleSinskiaSivovellaSkSkelipyxSkemmatocareSkemmatopygeSkljarella (=Proaraiopleura)SkreiaspisSkryjagnostusSlSlimanellaSnSnajdriaSneedvilliaSoSobovaspisSohopleuraSokhretiaSolariproetusSolenopariaSolenoparopsSolenopleuraSolenopleurellaSolenopleuropsisSolontzellaSomatrikelonSombrerellaSongkaniaSongtaoiaSongxitesSoomaspisSpSpathacalymeneSpatulata (=Spatulina)SpencellaSpencia (=Stauroholcus)SpergenaspisSphaeragnostusSphaerexochus (=Korolevium; =Onukia; =Parvixochus)Sphaerocoryphe (=Ellipsocoryphe; =Hemisphaerocoryphe)SphaerophthalmusSpinacephalusSpineulomaSpiniboleSpinibolopsSpinicryphopsSpinillaenusSpinimetopusSpiniscutellumSpinoproetusSpirantyxSpizharaspisSqSquarrosoellaStStapeleyellaStaurocephalusStegnopsisStelckaspisStellaStenambonStenelymusStenoblepharum (=Viruanaspis)StenochilinaStenopareiaStenopilusStenorhachisStephanocareStephenaspisSternbergaspisSthenarocalymeneStigmacephaloidesStigmacephalusStigmadiscusStigmametopusStigmaspisStigmatoaStiktocybeleStoeckliniaStrenuaeva (=Hindermeyeria)StrenuellaStrettoniaStrictagnostusStrigambitusStrigigenalisStrotactinusStrotocephalaStrusziaStruveaspisStruveopsStruveproetusStruveriaStubblefieldiaStummianaStyginaStyginellaSuSubeiaSubitellaSudanomocarinaSujaraspisSukhanaspis (=Kerbinella)SulcocephalusSulcuboleSuludellaSuluderella (="Mareda") SuluktellaSunaspidellaSunaspisSuninaSunocavia (=Cavia)SunwaptiaSuriaspisSuribongiaSuvorovaaspisSuyougouiaSvSvalbarditesSvenaxSySycophantiaSymphyroxochusSymphysopsSymphysurina (=Symphysurinella; =Symphysuroides)SymphysurusSyndianellaSynphoria (=Eocorycephalus; =Neosynphoria)SynphoroidesSyspacheilusSzSzeaspis (=Spitiaspis)SzechuanellaSzechuanolenusT

TaTabalqueiaTabatopygellinaTadakoustiaTadjikiaTaemasaspis (=Gondwanaspis; =Snoderaspis)TaenicephalinaTaenicephalitesTaenicephalopsTaenicephalus (=Bemaspis; =Maustonia)TaenoraTafilaltaspisTagazellaTagenarellaTaianocephalusTaiganellaTaihangshaniaTaihungshania (=Miquelina)TaijiangiaTaijiangocephalusTaimyraspisTaipakiaTaishaniaTaitzehoiaTaitzuiaTaitzuinaTaklamakania (=Xinjiangia) TalacastopsTalbotinaTalbotinellaTalusTambakiaTamdaspis (=Psiloyuepingia)TangbailaspisTangjiaellaTangshihlingiaTangwangzhaiaTaniaspidellaTankhellaTannudiscusTanybregmaTaoyuania (=Batyraspis)TapinocalymeneTarijactinoides (=Bolivianaspis)Tarimella (=Yinganaspis)TarricoiaTarynaspis TasmanaspisTasmanocephalusTatonaspisTatulaspisTavseniaTawstockiaTaynaellaTcTchabdaniaTchaiaspis.TcherkesoviaTchernyshevioidesTchukeraspisTchuostachiaTeTegopelteTeichertopsTeinistion (=Dorypygella)TelaeomarrolithusTelephina (=Telephus)TelephopsTeljanzellaTellerinaTemnoura (=Asteromajia)TengfengiaTenuipeltisTerataspisTeratokopturaTeratorhynchusTerechtaspis (=Nellina)TermieraspisTermierellaTerranovellaTerranoviaTersellaTersicepsTesselacaudaTetiniaTetracerouraTetragonocephalusTetrapselliumTewoniaThThaiaspellaThaiaspisThailandiumThalabariaThaleops (=Hydrolaenus)TheamataspisThebanaspisThelecalymeneTheodenisia (=Denisia Clark 1924 (non Hübner, 1825: preoccupied); =Calculites; =Mannschreekia)ThigriffidesTholifrons (=Paraphoreotropsis)TholusThomastusThomondiaThoracocareThoralaspisThoralocolusThulincola (=Pharostomaspis)ThuringaspisThymurusThysanopeltellaThysanopeltisThysanopyge (=Basilicoides)

TiTianjingshaniaTianshanocephalusTiantouzhaniaTibagya (=Schizopyge)TibikephalusTienshihfuiaTienzhuiaTilsleyiaTimnaellaTimoraspisTinaspisTingocephalusTingyuaniaTjTjungiellaToToernquistia (=Paratoernquistia)ToernquistinaTolanaspisTolbinellaToletanaspisTolkieniaTollaspisTolstotchichaspisTomagnostellaTomagnostusTongxinaspisTonkinellaTorgaschinaToriferaTormesiscusTorosusTosacephalusTosotychiaTostoniaTownleyellaToxochasmopsToxophacopsToxotinaToxotisTrTrachopariaTrachycheilusTrachyostracusTramoriaTrapezocephalinaTretaspisTreveropygeTriadaspisTriangulaspis (=Acutaspis; =Angustaeva; =Plenudiscus; =Triangullina)TrianguraspisTriarthrellaTriarthroidesTriarthropsisTriarthrus (=Brongniartia)TricopeltaTricrepicephalus (=Paracrepicephalus)TrifonellaTrigocephalusTrigoncekoviaTrigonocercaTrigonocercellaTrigonyangaspis (=Trigonaspis)Trilobagnostus (=Rudagnostus)Trimerocephalus (=Eutrimerocephalus)TrimerolichasTrimerusTriniaTrinodus (=Arthrorhachis, =Metagnostus; =Girvanagnostus)TrinucleoidesTrinucleus (=Edgellia)Triplagnostus (=Huarpagnostus; =Solenagnostus; =Pentagnostus; =Aristarius; =Aotagnostus; =Acidusus?; =Canotagnostus; =Zeteagnostus)TriproetusTrisulcagnostus (=Tririmagnostus)Trochurus (=Corydocephalus; =Plusiarges; =Makromuktis)TroedssoniaTropiconiproetusTropicorypheTropidocareTropidocorypheTropidopygeTruncatometopusTrymataspisTrypaulitesTsTsaidamaspisTschernyschewiella (=Schmidtia)Tsinania (=Dictyites)Tsunyidiscus (=Mianxiandiscus; =Liangshandiscus; =Emeidiscus; =Hupeidiscus; =Shizhudiscus; =Guizhoudiscus)

TuTuberaspisTugurellumTukalandaspisTumicephalusTumidulaspisTumulinaTungtzuellaTungusellaTuojiangellaTurantyxTurcopygeTurgicephalusTurkestanellaTuvanella (=Eleganolimba)TuvanellusTuyunaspisTyTylotaitzuiaTylotaspisTympanuellaTyphlokorynetesTyphloniscusTyphloproetusTzTzuchiatocnemisU

UdUdjanellaUkUktaspisUlUlakhanellaUlaniaUllaspisUlrichaspisUlugtellaUnUncaspisUndilliaUnguliproetusUnicapeltisUpUpplandiopsUrUralichas (=Bohemolichas; =Platopolichas)UralopsUraloscutellumUrbanaspisUriarraUripesUrjungaspisUromystrumUrsinellaUsUshbaspis (=Metaredlichioides)UsovianaUsovinurusUsumunaspisUtUtagnostusUtaspisUtiaUxUxunellaV

VaValdaitesValdariopsValenagnostusValidaspisValongiaValtoressiaVandergrachtiaVanuxemella (=Vistoia)VaranellaVariopeltaVarviaVeVegaVelieuxiaVenosusVeragraulosVerditerrinaVerkholenellaVermontellaVernaculinaViViaphacopsVicaVicinoproetus (=Vicinopeltis)Victorispina  VidriaVietnamiaVironiaspisVistoiaVittaellaVoVogdesiaVogesinaVoigtaspisVokoviciaVolchovitesVolkopsVolocephalinaVologdinaspisVolonellusVyVysocaniaW

WaWaergangiaWafangdianiaWafangiaWagnerispinaWaideggulaWaigatchellaWaisfeldaspisWalcottaspidellaWalcottaspisWaldminiaWalencrinuroidesWallaciaWalliseropsWanbeiaspisWandelellaWangcuniaWangzishiaWanhuaiaWannaniaWanneriaWanshaniaWanwanaspisWanwanoglobusWarburgaspisWarburgella (=Holometopus; =Owensella)WarendiaWariboleWayaoniaWeWeaniaWeberiphillipsia (=Spinolimbella)WeberopeltisWedekindiaspis (=Wedekindia) WeeksinaWeijiaspisWeishaniaWelleraspis (=Avonaspis)WenganellaWengangaspisWenganlenusWentsuiaWestergaardellaWestergaardia (=Sphaerophthalmoides)WestergaarditesWestonaspisWestropiaWeyeraspisWeyeritesWeymouthiaWhWhittakeritesWhittardolithusWhittingtonellaWhittingtoniaWiWilberniaWilcoxaspisWilsonarellaWiniskiaWinterbergiaWitryidesWittekindtiaWoWolayellaWolfartaspisWolfartius (= "Farsia") WolynaspisWongiaWuWuanoidesWuchuanellaWudangiaWuhainaWuhuia (=Deadwoodia)WuhushaniaWujiajianiaWuoaspis (=Coronaspis)WutaishanaspisWutaishaniaWutingaspisWutingshaniaX

XeXelaXenadocheXenasaphusXenoboloidesXenocheilosXenocybeXenocyclopygeXenodechenellaXenoredlichiaXenostegiumXestagnostusXiXilingxiaXianfengiaXiangiaXiangqianaspisXiangshanaspisXiangshaniaXiangzhongellaXiaodaosituniaXiaofangshangiaXiaomajiellaXiaoshiellaXichuaniaXinanocephalusXinglongiaXingrenaspis (=Spitella; =Danzhaina; =Wuxunaspis)XingzishaniaXinhuangaspisXintaiaXiphogonium (=Trautensteinproetus)XiuqiellaXiushanopsisXiushuilithusXiushuiproetusXuXuaneniaXundianiaXuzhouiaXyXylabionXyoeaxXystocrania (=Xialiangshania)Xystridura (=Milesia)

Y

YaYabeiaYakutiana (=Pseudophalacroma)Yangweizhouia YanhaoiaYanquetruziaYanshanaspisYanshaniaYanshanopyge  YantaiellaYanzhuangiaYaopuiaYaoyiayuellaYarmakaspisYeYeshanaspisYiYichangaspisYilliangella (=Palaeoaspis)YilliangellinaYinaspisYingziaspisYinitesYinjiangiaYinpanolithus YinshanaspisYishanaspisYoYohoaspisYokuseniaYongwoliaYorkellaYosimuraspis (=Eoyosimuraspis; =Metayosimuraspis) YoungiaYoyarriaYuYuehsienszellaYuepingioidesYujiniaYuknessaspisYukonaspisYukoniaYukonidesYumenaspisYunlingiaYunmengshaniaYunnanaspidellaYunnanaspisYunnanocephalus (=Pseudoptychoparia)YurakiaYushugouiaZ

ZaZacanthellina Zacanthoides (=Embolimus)Zacanthopsina Zacanthopsis  Zacompsus Zaozhuangaspis   Zaplaops ZazvorkaspisZbZbiroviaZdZdicellaZeZeliszkella Zetaproetus  ZetillaenusZhZhaishania Zhanglouia Zhangshania  Zhegangula Zhejiangoproetus  Zhenania Zhenbaspis (=Yankongia; =Zhenxiongaspis)Zhenganites (=Eosoptychopyge)Zhenpingaspis  Zhongtiaoshanaspis  Zhongweia Zhuangliella  Zhuitunia Zhujia ZhusilengopsZiZiboaspidella ZiboaspisZigzuellaZlZlichovaspis (=Devonodontochile; =Spinodontochile)

ZoZoraspisZuZuninaspis''

See also 
 List of ammonite genera

Notes and references 
Uncited genera names can be attributed to Sepkoski (2002) and Jell & Adrain (2003).

Bibliography 
 

 List
Lists of prehistoric arthropods
Trilobites